Nathaniel Wood may refer to:
 Nathaniel Wood (occultist)
 Nathaniel Wood (fighter)

See also
 Nathan Wood (disambiguation)
 Nate Wood, American jazz musician